Andamia amphibius is a species of combtooth blenny found in the western central Pacific Ocean, it is found in intertidal zone on exposed rocky shores of the Solomon Islands and Vanuatu to a depth of . It can breathe air and will move between rock pools at low tide. It is herbivorous. It lays adhesive eggs which are attached to the rocks with a filament while the larvae are planktonic and are frequently encountered in shallow water.

References

amphibius
Fish described in 1792